The 2002 Australian Football International Cup was the inaugural international Australian rules football tournament held in Melbourne, Australia in 2002.

11 nations participated from around the world and the tournament was officiated by the International Australian Football Council.

Ireland won the tournament, finishing undefeated and victorious over Papua New Guinea in the Grand Final on 23 August at the Melbourne Cricket Ground (MCG).

Pool A

Pool B

Round 1
PNG 13.11 (89) d. Great Britain 2.2 (14) – Warrawee Park, Oakleigh
Nauru 17.17 (119) d. Japan 1.8 (14) – Warrawee Park, Oakleigh
USA 7.10 (52) d. Samoa 4.7 (31) – TEAC Oval, Port Melbourne
New Zealand 25.13 (163) d. South Africa 0.1 (1) – Trevor Barker Beach Oval, Sandringham
Ireland 7.14 (56) d. Canada 4.7 (31) – Trevor Barker Beach Oval, Sandringham

Round 2
PNG 9.15 (69) d. Denmark 3.5 (23) 
Great Britain 9.11 (65) d. Nauru 8.11 (59) – Elsternwick Park, Elsternwick
Canada 4.11 (38) d. South Africa 1.5 (11) 
Ireland 5.6 (36) d. Samoa 4.5 (29) 
New Zealand 11.12 (78) d. USA 4.1 (25)

Round 3
Great Britain 7.3 (45) d. Japan 4.6 (30) – Whitten Oval, Footscray
Denmark 5.10 (40) d. Nauru 3.9 (27) 
Samoa 12.15 (87) d. South Africa 1.4 (10) 
New Zealand 10.8 (68) d. Canada 2.6 (18) 
Ireland 7.7 (49) d. USA 6.3 (39)

Round 4
Denmark 12.9 (81) d. Great Britain 4.2 (26) 
PNG 23.9 (147) d. Japan 0.0 (0) 
Ireland 15.8 (98) d. South Africa 3.3 (21) 
USA 8.4 (52) d. Canada 1.1 (7) 
New Zealand 10.10 (70) d. Samoa 5.8 (38)

Round 5
Denmark 10.6 (66) d. Japan 4.7 (32) 
PNG 13.13 (91) d. Nauru 6.8 (44) 
USA 20.12 (132) d. South Africa 0.4 (4) 
Samoa 9.15 (69) d. Canada 0.5 (5) 
Ireland 4.10 (34) d. New Zealand 3.2 (20)

Minor Placing deciders
New Zealand 3.7 (25) d. Denmark 2.4 (16) 
Samoa 5.7 (37) d. Nauru 2.8 (20) 
Canada 6.5 (41) d. Japan 5.2 (32) 
USA 13.15 (93) d. Great Britain 2.3 (15) – Junction Oval, St Kilda

Grand final
Friday 23 August 2002

 Grand Final was played as a curtain raiser to the round 21 AFL match between Hawthorn vs North Melbourne, so this figure is the total crowd for the match, although not all spectators were inside the stadium at the start or conclusion of the curtain raiser event.

Final standings
  Ireland 
  Papua New Guinea 
  New Zealand 
  Denmark 
  USA 
  Great Britain 
  Samoa 
  Nauru 
  Canada 
  Japan 
  South Africa

All-International Team
A 22 player All-International squad was named, however names were unplaced and not allocated to any specific field position.

References

External links
 http://www.aussierulesinternational.com
Australian Football International Cup, 2002 – World Footy News review

Australian Football International Cup
Australian Football International Cup, 2002